Lepidochrysops pephredo, the Estcourt blue, is a species of butterfly in the family Lycaenidae. It is endemic to South Africa, and is found in the grassy hills of the KwaZulu-Natal midlands.

Adults are on wing from October to November. There is one generation per year.

The larvae feed on Becium grandiflorum. Third and later instar larvae feed on the brood of Camponotus niveosetus ants.

References

External links
Die Gross-Schmetterlinge der Erde 13: Die Afrikanischen Tagfalter. Plate XIII 65 k

Lepidochrysops
Butterflies described in 1889
Endemic butterflies of South Africa
Taxa named by Roland Trimen
Taxonomy articles created by Polbot